The name CBC Radio may refer to:

 CBC Radio, a radio broadcasting service of the Canadian Broadcasting Corporation
 CBC Radio (Barbados), a radio broadcasting service of the Caribbean Broadcasting Corporation
 XEBG-AM, a radio station in Tijuana, Mexico that uses the "CBC Radio" name
 Chubu-Nippon Broadcasting, a Japanese radio broadcaster
 Red Dragon FM, a commercial radio station in Cardiff, Wales that was once known as CBC